Coimbatore District was one of the districts of the erstwhile Madras Presidency of British India. It covered the areas of the present-day districts of Coimbatore, Erode and Tirupur and the Kollegal taluk of present-day Karnataka. The administrative headquarters was Coimbatore city. Most of Coimbatore's inhabitants were Tamil-speaking but there were also large numbers of Malayalam, Telugu and Kannada speaking people.

History
Coimbatore was a part of the ancient Chera kingdom during the Sangam Age. After the Chera kingdom fell, the region was ruled by the Western Gangas and the Hoysalas. Coimbatore came under Muslim rule in the 13th century AD and was a province of the Vijayanagar Empire. After the fall of the Vijayanagar Empire, Coimbatore was ruled by the Madurai Nayaks till 17th century. A series of wars between the Kingdoms of Kingdom of Mysore of Madurai Nayak dynasty resulted in the region coming under the control of Mysore kings till the defeat of Tipu Sultan in the Third Mysore War in 1792, Coimbatore became a part of British India.

The district was founded in 1805. In 1868 Nilgiri District was segregated. The Avinashi taluk was formed when Karur was separated from the district and merged with Trichinopoly District. In 1927 and 1929 other readjustments were made. In 1956 the Kollegal taluk was transferred to Mysore State. In 1975 and 1979 some subtaluks were promoted to taluks, including Satyamangalam, Perundurai and Mettupalayam, so that Coimbatore district ended up with 12 taluks, but before the end of 1979 the six taluks of Bhavani, Gopichettipalaiyam, Satyamangalam, Erode, Perundurai and Dharapuram, were segregated to form Erode district. The remaining six taluks became nine after two new ones were established and a further one was bifurcated.

Taluks 

Coimbatore district was sub-divided into 10 taluks:

 Bhavani (Headquarters: Bhavani)
 Coimbatore (Headquarters: Coimbatore)
 Dharapuram (Headquarters: Dharapuram)
 Erode (Headquarters: Erode)
 Karur (Headquarters: Karur)
 Kollegal (Headquarters: Kollegal)
 Palladam (Headquarters: Palladam)
 Pollachi (Headquarters: Pollachi)
 Satyamangalam (Headquarters: Gobichettipalayam)
 Udamalpet (Headquarters: Udamalpet)

Administration 

Coimbatore district was divided into 4 sub-divisions:

 Coimbatore sub-division: Coimbatore and Sathyamangalam taluks
 Erode sub-division: Bhavani, Dharapuram, Erode and Karur taluks
 Kollegal sub-division: Kollegal taluk
 Pollachi sub-division: Pollachi, Palladam and Udumalpet

See also
History of Coimbatore

References 

Districts of the Madras Presidency
Coimbatore district
1805 establishments in British India